Who's Who:  The Definitive Directory of the DC Universe (1985–87), usually referred to simply as Who's Who, is the umbrella title for a number of comic book series which DC Comics published to catalogue the wide variety of fictional characters in their imaginary universe, the DC Universe.

History
Who's Who was the creation of Len Wein, Marv Wolfman, and Robert Greenberger, and its first incarnation (Who's Who: The Definitive Directory of the DC Universe) debuted in the last month of 1984 (cover-dated March 1985) and ran for 26 issues until 1987 (cover-dated April 1987). It was essentially an encyclopedia in comic book form, listing the characters, places, and technology in the DC Universe,, with a loose leaf format devised by editor Michael Eury. It began one month before the 12-issue limited series Crisis on Infinite Earths began; therefore, the earlier issues discuss Pre-Crisis versions of the characters, whereas issues released after the conclusion of the limited series discuss the Post-Crisis versions. For example, while both the Flash and Supergirl died during the Crisis, the Flash's death is not mentioned as issue #8 predates his death, but Supergirl's death is recounted 14 months later in issue #22. Also, characters such as Superman and Wonder Woman were rebooted during the series' run, so their entries recounted their Post-Crisis histories only, while their entire Silver Age histories (and all the unique elements of those characters during that time, such as Superman's Fortress of Solitude and Wonder Woman's powerless period) were ignored.

Who's Who was DC's answer to The Official Handbook of the Marvel Universe, which was published a few years earlier. Each character had an individualized logo instead of a standard typeface; figures were shown in action poses rather than full-body portraits drawn by individual artists; character histories and power descriptions were more vague; and characters from all of DC's various lines and imprints were included (such as out-of-continuity series like Camelot 3000 and Watchmen), not just those from its shared universe (although Who's Who Update '88 did limit its entries to in-continuity series only).

Various updated versions of the Who's Who have appeared over the years, including Who's Who Update '87 (five issues, cover dated August to December 1987) and Who's Who Update '88 (four issues, cover dated August to November 1988). Both books featured new entries, revised entries for characters in previous volumes, and an Appendix which included minor updates and corrections for previous entries. In 1989, most of the DC Annuals released that year included Who's Who entries. Many of these were revised versions of entries in the regular Who's Who series, but there were several new entries (particularly for supporting characters).

DC Comics also put out two Who's Who spin-off series in the 1980s. The first was Who's Who in Star Trek, a two-issue series (cover-dated March and April 1987) which profiled many of the people and places from the 1960s Star Trek series (and subsequent movies), the 1970s animated series and the 1980s Star Trek comic book published by DC. As the series was released prior to the premiere of Star Trek: The Next Generation, no information from that series was included.

The second spin-off was Who's Who in the Legion of Super-Heroes, a seven-issue series (cover-dated April to November 1988) which expanded on the Legion information included in the regular Who's Who and featured profiles on the various supporting characters, organizations, locations and villains which have appeared in Legion stories over the years. Some of the information contained in this book was Post-Crisis instead of Pre-Crisis. For example, the Superboy profile relates the Post-Crisis origin of the character as a creation of the Time Trapper, and there is no profile for Supergirl, despite her many adventures with the Legion, since by this time she was written out of continuity.

In 1990, DC started over with a new Who's Who series titled Who's Who in the DC Universe (16 loose-leaf issues with binders sold separately, cover-dated August 1990 to February 1992). This book was not as comprehensive as the previous Who's Who (for example, there was no entry for the Atom, even though his character was undergoing major changes in the comic Suicide Squad), and some of the entries took on a less serious tone. One instance is an entry for Guy Gardner, which is written from the character's perspective. Another instance is a blank entry for Death, which has all the usual information headings crossed out and blue marker scrawl stating simply "Someday you'll meet her. You can find out for yourself".

This series was followed up by Who's Who in the DC Universe Update 1993 (two loose-leaf issues, cover-dated December 1992 and January 1993). DC also released a Who's Who series for their Impact Comics line (three loose-leaf issues, cover-dated September 1991 to May 1992).

During the period from the late 1990s through the end of the 2000s, Who's Who was replaced with Secret Files and Origins, a series of one-shots devoted to particular characters or events in the DC Universe and which feature Who's Who-like profiles. DK Publishing has also released a number of Ultimate Guides, as well as a book titled The DC Comics Encyclopedia, which serve a similar purpose.

In December 2009, DC announced a new Who's Who series to be published in 2010 as part of the company's 75th anniversary celebration. The series was later announced for 18 issues, 48 pages per issue, beginning in May 2010 with Bob Greenberger as sole writer and Bob Harras as editor. The series launch was subsequently delayed, but in October DC vice-president Dan DiDio stated that the series would be released after the 2011 DCU line-wide event, Flashpoint. The history of the DC Universe received an extensive overhaul in the aftermath of said Flashpoint event. The resulting New 52 comics are set in a greatly altered continuity, making a new edition of Who's Who unlikely in the short term because the histories of many characters are in a state of flux.

Bibliography of Who's Who series

Who's Who: The Definitive Directory of the DC Universe

Who's Who Update '87

Who's Who Update '88

Who's Who 1989 Annuals

Who's Who in Star Trek

Who's Who in the Legion of Super-Heroes

Who's Who in the DC Universe

Who's Who in the DC Universe Update 1993

Impact Comics Who's Who

Collected editions
 Who’s Who Omnibus
 Volume 1 collects Who’s Who: The Definitive Directory of the DC Universe Volumes I-XXVI, Who’s Who Update 1987 #1-5, Who’s Who Update 1988 #1-4, and the Who’s Who profiles from Action Comics Annual #2, Batman Annual #13, Blackhawk Annual #1, Detective Comics Annual #2, Doctor Fate Annual #1, Green Arrow Annual #2, Justice League Annual #3, Secret Origins Annual #3, Swamp Thing Annual #5, The Flash Annual #3, The New Titans Annual #5, The Question Annual #2, and Wonder Woman Annual #2; 1,320 pages, April 2021,

In other media
In the Batman: The Brave and the Bold episode "Emperor Joker", during a battle between Batman and the Ten-Eyed Man, Bat-Mite (who breaks the fourth wall) was seen reading about the Ten-Eyed Man in issue #23 of the original Who's Who series.

See also

 Official Handbook of the Marvel Universe

Notes

References

External links
An unofficial version of Who's Who
Who's Who Article at DC Database Project
Who's Who – The Definitive Podcast of the DC Universe

Comics by Len Wein
Comics by Marv Wolfman
Comics by Paul Levitz
DC Comics titles
1985 comics debuts
Encyclopedias of fictional worlds
Magazines about comics